The Shattered Statue is an adventure module published in 1987 for the Advanced Dungeons & Dragons fantasy role-playing game.

Plot summary
The Shattered Statue is a Forgotten Realms adventure scenario in which the player characters have been hired to find the pieces of a broken ancient statue so that it can be reassembled and reanimated.

This adventure was designed for Advanced Dungeons & Dragons but is also compatible with DragonQuest and includes new magic rules for that game.

Publication history
DQ1 The Shattered Statue was written by Jennell Jaquays with David J. Ritchie and Gerry Klug, with a cover by Daniel Horne and interior illustrations by Jaquays, and was published by TSR in 1988 as a 48-page booklet with an outer folder.

Reception

Reviews

Notes

References

DragonQuest
Dungeons & Dragons modules
Role-playing game supplements introduced in 1988